The Sarawak State Museum is the oldest museum in Borneo. It was founded in 1888 and opened in 1891 in a purpose-built building in Kuching, Sarawak. It has been said that naturalist Alfred Russel Wallace encouraged Charles Brooke, the second White Rajah of Sarawak, to establish the museum: there is no evidence for this (Wallace, although he did return to England with Charles (Johnson) in 1862, supported his elder brother, Brooke, when he was disinherited in 1863, so is unlikely to have retained any links).

History

The visit of Alfred Wallace, may have increased Charles Brooke's interest in the natural history of Sarawak to the extent that, since 1878, he asked his officers to collect specimens throughout the state, with a view to building a museum in the future. As the collections began to increase, the specimens were put inside a clock tower at a government office. Then, the specimens were moved to a room above an old vegetable market when Hugh Brooke Low's collections arrived from the Rajang River.  The room above the old vegetable market acted as a temporary museum and was open to the public. Finally, the proper Sarawak museum was built in 1889 and opened on 4 August 1891. The museum extended a new wing in 1911. However, the brick work steps outside the old wing was demolished in 1912. The building was built to permanently house and display local indigenous arts and crafts, and collections of local animals.

During the Japanese Occupation, the museum was directed by a Japanese officer, who was sympathetic to its goals. He protected it and the museum suffered very little damage or looting.

The historic building has been renovated. It is used to exhibit and interpret collections on the natural history of Sarawak. Shell Oil sponsored an exhibit on the petroleum industry, which has been important to Borneo. In addition, it displays archaeological artifacts and reconstructions of examples of the traditional life of the indigenous peoples, and of their arts and crafts. It has the most comprehensive archaeological, natural history, and ethnographic collections on Borneo.

Starting 23 October 2017, the state museum was temporarily closed for refurbishment works. A total of RM28 million was spent on renovating the historic museum building with another RM 280 million spent on constructing a new museum campus building nearby. The new museum building named as "Borneo Cultures Museum" was opened in March 2022. It is the largest museum complex in Malaysia, and second largest in Southeast Asia, after Singapore National Museum.

Architecture
The building has undergone several renovations and alterations since its construction. It is rectangular, 44' × 160' with walls and pillars of bricks. The museum building has European-style architecture with its edifice in Queen Anne style. It bears a strong resemblance to the Samuel Way Building of the Adelaide Women's and Children's Hospital. The galleries are lit by dormer windows on the roof, making wall space available for exhibit displays and collections.

Layout

The ground floor of the museum holds the natural history collection and specimens of Sarawak fauna – reptiles, mammals, birds, etc., all expertly prepared and mounted for display. The west wing of the museum houses the Shell exhibition on the petroleum industries of Sarawak.

The first floor has exhibits of ethnographic artifacts of the indigenous peoples, such as models of the various types of longhouses, musical instruments, various kinds of fish and animal traps, handicrafts, models of boats and others.

Activities
The museum has been proclaimed guardian of the national patrimony, with the responsibility to search for, acquire and protect antiquities and historical monuments. The museum director is also responsible for protecting marine turtles and assisting the chief game warden in the conservation of wildlife.

Museum journal
The Sarawak Museum Journal is published by the museum staff. It was first published in 1911, with John Moulton the inaugural editor, making it one of the oldest scientific journals of the South-East Asian region.  Topics covered include the history, natural history and ethnology of the island of Borneo.

Curators and directors

Until 1974, the head of the museum was termed "Curator":
 John Edgar Anderson Lewis — Pro tem Curator, acting from 25 June 1888 – 1902
 Dr George Darby Haviland — 26 February 1891 – 1 March 1893
 Edward Bartlett —  1 March 1893 – 22 July 1897
 Robert Walter Campbell Shelford — 22 July 1897 – 2 February 1905
 John Hewitt —  2 February 1905 – November 1908
 John Coney Moulton — November 1908 – 22 January 1915
 Mr Erman & K. H. Gillan — Officers in charge, 22 January 1915 – May 1922 (during WWI)
 Dr Eric Georg Mjöberg — May 1922 – 19 December 1924
 Gerard T.M. MacBryan — Acting Curator, 20 December 1924 – 24 January 1925
 Edward Banks —  20 February 1925 – 1945 (1942–1945 interned)
 Tom Harrisson — June 1947 – November 1966
 Benedict Sandin — December 1966 – March 1974

After this, "Director" was the title for the head of the museum:
 Lucas Chin — 1 April 1974 – December 1991
 Dr Peter M. Kedit — December 1991 – April 1996
 Sanib Said —  May 1997 – December 2008
 Ipoi Datan — January 2009 – February 2019
 Suria Bin Bujang — February 2019 - 2020 (acting)
 Tazudin Mohtar — 2020 - November 2022

See also
 List of museums in Malaysia

Literature

References

External links

 Sarawak Museums

Museums established in 1888
Museums in Sarawak
Buildings and structures in Kuching
Local museums
1888 establishments in Sarawak
Tourist attractions in Kuching
19th-century architecture in Malaysia